Danişment is a Turkish place name and it may refer to

Danişment, Yenipazar a village in Yenipazar district of Bilecik Province
Danişment, Aydın a village in the central district of Aydın Province
Danişment, Bayburt a village in the central district of Bayburt Province
Danişment, Kurucaşile a village in Kurucaşile of Bartın Province
Danişment, Nallıhan a village in Nallıhan district of Ankara Province
Danişment, Yüreğir a village in the central district (Yüreğir) of Adana Province
Danişment, Balya, a village
Danişment, Biga
Danişment, Horasan
Danişment, Ilgaz
Danişment, Keşan
Danişment, Osmancık

See also
Danishmends
Danishmend Gazi